This article is an incomplete list of wars and conflicts involving Switzerland, since the creation of the Old Swiss Confederacy.

Old Swiss Confederacy

Growth (1291–1523)

Reformation (1523–1648)

Ancien Régime (1648–1798)

Napoleonic Era and Restoration (1798–1848)

Modern Era

See also
Military history of Switzerland
Swiss Army

References

Wars
Switzerland
Wars